4660 Nereus, provisional designation 1982 DB, is a small (about ) asteroid. It was discovered by Eleanor F. Helin on 28 February 1982, approximately a month after it passed  from Earth.

Nereus is potentially an important asteroid with a high albedo. It is an Apollo and Mars-crosser, with an orbit that frequently comes close to Earth, and because of this it is exceptionally accessible to spacecraft. Indeed, because of its small size and close orbit, its delta-V for rendezvous of ~5 km/s is smaller than the Moon's, which is about 6.3 km/s.

Nereus makes seven approaches to Earth of less than 5 million km between 1900 and 2100. The closest will be on 14 February 2060, at 1.2 million km. The most recent closest approach was on 11 December 2021, when it was 3.9 million km away. During the 2021 approach, the asteroid peaked around apparent magnitude 12.6, requiring a telescope with around a 100mm objective lens to be visually seen. Its orbital period of 1.82 yr also puts it somewhat near a 2:1 orbital resonance with Earth, which means that an approximately 4-year mission could depart for and return from the asteroid on relatively near passes to the Earth.

Nereus is classified as a potentially hazardous asteroid (PHA), due to both its absolute magnitude  and its minimum orbit intersection distance .

The asteroid is classified as E-type, so it could be potentially associated with aubrite meteorites (enstatite achondrites).

Spacecraft

Nereus was proposed for visitation by both the private Near Earth Asteroid Prospector (NEAP) probe, and the Japanese sample return mission Hayabusa. However, the NEAP probe was not realized, and the Hayabusa's launch was delayed by 10 months and the probe had to be redirected to 25143 Itokawa.

4660 Nereus was considered as a flyby target of the NEAR robotic spacecraft mission. NEAR was eventually launched, but visited 253 Mathilde and 433 Eros.

Physical characteristics

Nereus has been imaged by radar, revealing a slightly elongated shape which would allow for stable orbits around it.  Earlier optical measurements had given an estimated diameter of about  meters.  More recent work on the analysis of the radar data gives a much more detailed shape for Nereus as well as a fairly detailed terrain map of the surface.

On the ends of its longest axis, one end appears narrower and rounder than the other, larger end, making it more of an egg shape. The larger end also appears to have a flatter region on one side of it. Nereus rotates about an axis roughly perpendicular to its longest axis much like a silver spoon spinning on a table.

Name
Although the discoverer is given the opportunity to name the asteroid, Helin donated naming rights to the Planetary Society which organized a naming contest. The winner, Robert M. Cutler, then an employee of NASA contractor The MITRE Corporation, named the asteroid after the ancient Greek proto-god Nereus who had characteristics later attributed to Apollo (prophecy) and Poseidon (a sea god similar to Nereus but with legs rather than a fish tail).

See also 
 List of minor planets and comets visited by spacecraft

References

External links 

 IAUC 3675
 IAUC 3677
 IAUC 3686
 IAUC 5092
 
 
 

004660
Discoveries by Eleanor F. Helin
Named minor planets
004660
004660
2021211
19820228